The Indian National Congress politician Vilasrao Deshmukh formed his first government after the 1999 Maharashtra Legislative Assembly election. The government consisted of Deshmukh's Congress party, Nationalist Congress Party, several smaller parties, and independent politicians. Deshmukh was sworn in on October 18, 1999 and continued as Chief Minister until his resignation on January 16, 2003.

Government formation
The 1999 elections had returned Congress as the largest legislative party with 75 out of the State's 288 legislative assembly seats. Deshmukh, who had previously served as a cabinet minister in the State was subsequently supported by the Nationalist Congress Party, Peasants and Workers Party of India, Bharipa Bahujan Mahasangh, Republican Party of India (Gavai), Republican Party of India (Athawale), Samajwadi Party, Janata Dal (Secular), and Independents. The Communist Party of India (Marxist) supported the government from outside.

The ministry had initially consisted of 61 member. However, coalition partner NCP was concerned with the large size of the cabinet. As a compromise, Deshmukh agreed that his Congress party would drop one cabinet minister and three ministers of state, while the NCP would ask two of its junior ministers to resign.

List of ministers
The cabinet consisted of 55 members - Deshmukh, his Deputy Chhagan Bhujbal, 24 cabinet ministers, and 29 ministers of state.

Cabinet ministers
The following ministers were allocated portfolios in October 1999.

Ministers of state
The ministers also included the following ministers of state.

References

Indian National Congress
1999 in Indian politics
D
Nationalist Congress Party
Cabinets established in 1999
Cabinets disestablished in 2003